Walter Harold Nagle [Lucky] (March 10, 1880 – May 26, 1971) was a pitcher in Major League Baseball who played for the Pittsburgh Pirates and Boston Red Sox during the  season. He was born in Santa Rosa, California.

In one season career, Nagle posted a 5–3 record with a 3.48 ERA in 13 appearances, including four starts, one complete game, one save, 23 strikeouts, 12 walks, 60 hits allowed, and 54⅓ innings of work.  He later was player/manager of the San Jose Bears in the California State League in 1913.

Nagle wrote a book, titled Five Straight Errors On Ladies Day, about his life experiences including his friendship with baseball legend Ty Cobb.

Nagle died at the age of 91 in his homeland of Santa Rosa, California. (obit in "Santa Rosa Recorder", 27 May 1971)

External links
Baseball Reference
Retrosheet

Boston Red Sox players
Pittsburgh Pirates players
Major League Baseball pitchers
Baseball players from California
1880 births
1971 deaths
Minor league baseball managers
Oakland Commuters players
San Francisco (minor league baseball) players
Fresno (minor league baseball) players
Los Angeles Angels (minor league) players
Stockton Millers players
San Jose Bears players